Neoanagraphis is a genus of spiders in the family Liocranidae. It was first described in 1936 by Gertsch and Mulaik. , it contains two species: N. chamberlini and N. pearcei.

References

Liocranidae
Spiders of the United States
Spiders of Mexico